Sephardic Jewish cuisine is an assortment of cooking traditions that developed among the Sephardi Jews. 

Those of this Iberian origin who were dispersed in the Sephardic Diaspora ultimately became the Eastern Sephardim and North African Sephardim as they settled throughout the Mediterranean in Turkey, Greece, the Balkans, and the Arab countries of West Asia and North Africa. 

Cuisine of the Sephardi Jews also includes the cuisine of those who became the Western Sephardim who settled in Holland, England, and from these places elsewhere.

Mizrahi Jews, being the pre-existing Jews of the Greater Middle East (of non-Spanish and non-Portuguese origin), are sometimes called Sephardim in a broader sense due to their style of liturgy. Although there is some overlap in populations due to the Sephardic Diaspora, Sephardic Jews also settled in many other countries outside the Greater Middle East as well.

As such, this article deals only with the cuisine of the Jewish populations with ancestral origins in the Iberian Peninsula, in whichever regions they settled, not just the Greater Middle East. For Cuisine of the Mizrahi Jews, please see that article.

As with other Jewish ethnic divisions composing the Jewish Diaspora, Sephardim cooked foods that were popular in their countries of residence, adapting them to Jewish religious dietary requirements, kashrut. Their choice of foods was also determined by economic factors, with many of the dishes based on inexpensive and readily available ingredients.

Animals deemed permissible as a source of meat had to be slaughtered in keeping with shechita, or Jewish ritual slaughter, which requires soaking and salting to remove blood. Hence, meat was often reserved for holidays and special occasions. Many Sephardi dishes use ground meat. Milk and meat products could not be mixed or served at the same meal. 

Cooked, stuffed and baked vegetables are central to the cuisine, as are various kinds of beans, chickpeas, lentils, and bulgur/burghul (cracked wheat). Rice takes the place of potatoes.

History

Sephardi Jews are the Jews of Spain, who were expelled or forced to convert to Christianity in 1492. Many of those expelled settled in North-African Berber and Arabic-speaking countries, such as Morocco, Tunisia, Algeria and Libya, becoming the North African Sephardim. Those who settled in Greece, Turkey, the Balkans, Syria, the Lebanon and the Holy Land became the Eastern Sephardim. 

The Western Sephardim, also known more ambiguously as the Spanish and Portuguese Jews, left Spain and Portugal as New Christians in a steady stream over the next few centuries, and converted back to Judaism once in Holland, England, etc.

While the pre-existing Jews of the countries in which they settled (in the Greater Middle East, for example, are called Mizrahim) are distinct, the term Sephardi as used in "Sephardi cuisine" would refer only to the culinary traditions of those Jews with ancestral origins to the Jews of Spain and Portugal.

Both the Jews of the Iberian Peninsula and the pre-existing Jews of Morocco, Tunisia, Algeria, Bulgaria, Turkey, Syria, Egypt, Italy, and Greece into whose communities they settled adapted local dishes to the constraints of the kosher kitchen. 

Since the establishment of a Jewish state and the convergence of Jews from all the globe in Israel, these local cuisines, with all their differences, have come to represent the collection of culinary traditions broadly known as Sephardi cuisine.

Some of the Jews who fled from the Inquisition with other Sephardim in the 15th century settled in Recife, Brazil, where their cuisine was influenced by new local ingredients like molasses, rum, sugar, vanilla, chocolate, bell peppers, corn, tomatoes, kidney beans, string beans and turkey. 

In 1654, 23 Sephardic Jews arrived in New Amsterdam (present-day New York) bringing this cuisine with them to the early colonial United States. Early American Jewish cuisine was heavily influenced by this branch of Sephardic cuisine. 

Many of the recipes were bound up in observance of traditional holidays and remained true to their origins. These included dishes such as stew and fish fried in olive oil, beef and bean stews, almond puddings, and egg custards. The first kosher cookbook in America was the Jewish Cookery Book by Esther Levy which was published in 1871 in Philadelphia and includes many of the traditional recipes.

Cuisine basics

Sephardi cuisine emphasizes salads, stuffed vegetables and vine leaves, olive oil, lentils, fresh and dried fruits, herbs and nuts, and chickpeas. Meat dishes often make use of lamb or ground beef. 

Fresh lemon juice is added to many soups and sauces. Many meat and rice dishes incorporate dried fruits such as apricots, prunes and raisins. Pine nuts are used as a garnish.

Herbs and spices
In the early days, Sephardic cuisine was influenced by the local cuisines of Spain and Portugal, both under Catholic and Islamic regimes. A particular affinity to exotic foods from outside of Spain became apparent under Muslim rule, as evidenced even today with ingredients brought in by the Muslims.

Cumin, cilantro, and turmeric are very common in Sephardi cooking. Caraway and capers were brought to Spain by the Muslims and are featured in the cuisine. Cardamom (hel) is used to flavor coffee. Chopped fresh cilantro and parsley are popular garnishes. Chopped mint is added to salads and cooked dishes, and fresh mint leaves (nana) are served in tea. Cinnamon is sometimes used as a meat seasoning, especially in dishes made with ground meat. Saffron, which is grown in Spain, is used in many varieties of Sephardic cooking, as well as spices found in the areas where they have settled.

Desserts and beverages

Tiny cups of Turkish coffee, sometimes spiced with cardamom, are often served at the end of a festive meal, accompanied by small portions of baklava or other pastries dipped in syrup or honey. Hot sahlab, a liquidy cornstarch pudding originally flavored with orchid powder (today invariably replaced by artificial flavorings), is served in cups as a winter drink, garnished with cinnamon, nuts, coconut and raisins. Arak  is the preferred alcoholic beverage. Rose water is a common ingredient in cakes and desserts. Malabi, a cold cornstarch pudding, is sprinkled with rose water and red syrup.

Pickles and condiments
Olives and pickled vegetables, such as cucumbers, carrots, cabbage and cauliflower, are a standard accompaniment to meals. Amba is a pickled mango sauce. Small pickled lemons are a Tunisian and Moroccan delicacy.

Shabbat and holiday dishes

Shabbat

On Shabbat, the Jews of North Africa in Tunisia and Morocco serve chreime, fish in a spicy tomato sauce.

As cooking on Shabbat is prohibited, Sephardi Jews, like their Ashkenazi counterparts, developed slow-cooked foods that would simmer on a low flame overnight and be ready for eating the next day. 

One slow-cooked food was ropa vieja. The oldest name of the dish is chamin (from the Hebrew word "cham," which means "hot"), but there are several other names. When the Sephardic Jews were expelled from Spain in 1492, many fled to northwestern Africa across the Straits of Gibraltar. The hamin was changed, adjusting for local ingredients and then called dafina ("covered") in Morocco. Any favorite vegetables can be added, and the eggs can be removed and eaten at any time. Its Ashkenazi counterpart is called shalet or cholent. 

Shavfka is another Sephardi dish that has an Ashkenazi counterpart, namely kugel. Bourekas are often served on Shabbat morning. Pestelas, sesame-seed topped pastry filled with pine nuts, meat and onion, are also traditional.

Sambusak is a semicircular pocket of dough filled with mashed chickpeas, fried onions and spices associated with Sephardic Jewish cuisine. According to Gil Marks, an Israeli food historian, sambusak has been a traditional part of the Sephardic Sabbath meal since the 13th century.

Passover

Sephardi and Ashkenazi cooking differs substantially on Passover due to rabbinic rulings that allow the consumption of kitniyot, a category which is forbidden to Ashkenazi Jews. Sephardi Jews prepare charoset, one of the symbolic foods eaten at the Passover seder, from different ingredients. Whereas charoset in Ashkenazi homes is a blend of chopped apples and nuts spiced with wine and cinnamon, Sephardi charoset is based on raisins or dates and is generally much thicker in consistency.

Mina (known as scacchi in Italy) is a Passover meat or vegetable pie made with a matzo crust.

Rosh Hashana

At the beginning of the evening meals of Rosh Hashana, it is traditional to eat foods symbolic of a good year and to recite a short prayer beginning with the Hebrew words yehi ratson ("May it be Your will") over each one, with the name of the food in Hebrew or Aramaic often presenting a play on words. The foods eaten at this time have thus become known as yehi ratsones. 

Typical foods, often served on a large platter called a yehi ratson platter, include:
Apples dipped in honey, or baked or sometimes in the form of a compote called mansanada
Dates
Pomegranates, or black-eyed peas
Pumpkin, in the form of savory pumpkin-filled pastries called rodanchas
Leeks, in the form of fritters called keftedes de prasa
Beets, usually peeled and baked
Head of a fish, usually a fish course with a whole fish, head intact

It is also common to symbolize a year filled with blessings by eating foods with stuffing on Rosh Hashana such as a stuffed, roasted bird or a variety of stuffed vegetables called legumbres yaprakes.

Yom Kippur

Customs for the first food eaten after the Yom Kippur fast differ. Iranian Jews often eat a mixture of shredded apples mixed with rose water called faloodeh seeb. Syrian and Iraqi Jews eat round sesame crackers that look like mini-bagels. Turkish and Greek Jews sip a sweet drink made from melon seeds.

Hanukkah
Sephardic Hanukkah dishes include cassola (sweet cheese pancakes), bimuelos (puffed fritters with an orange glaze), keftes de espinaka (spinach patties), keftes de prasa (leek patties) and shamlias (fried pastry frills).

Other specialities

Almadrote—an oil, garlic and cheese sauce served with eggplant casserole
Baba ghanoush—mashed cooked eggplant, olive oil, lemon juice, various seasonings, and sometimes tahini
Baklava—a layered dessert made of filo pastry, filled with chopped nuts, and sweetened with syrup or honey
Börekitas—small borekas with eggplant, spinach and cheese
Couscous—small steamed balls of crushed durum wheat semolina traditionally served with stew spooned on top
Falafel—a deep-fried ball or patty-shaped fritter made from ground chickpeas, fava beans, or both
Fazuelos—fried dough formed into a spiral shape
Ful—a stew of cooked fava beans served with vegetable oil, cumin, and optionally with chopped parsley, garlic, onion, lemon juice, chili pepper and other vegetable, herb and spice ingredients
Haminados—hard-boiled eggs braised over many hours, turning brown in the course of all-night cooking
Halvah—a sweet sesame-based confection
Holishkes—blanched cabbage leaves wrapped in a around minced meat and simmered in tomato sauce
Hummus—a Middle-Eastern dip, spread, or savory dish made from cooked, mashed chickpeas blended with tahini, lemon juice, and garlic
Kibbeh—dishes usually made by pounding bulgur wheat together with meat into a fine paste and forming it into balls with toasted pine nuts and spices
Kubbana—a traditional Yemenite Jewish bread similar to monkey bread
Lahoh—a spongy, pancake-like bread that originated from Yemen
Ma'amoul—shortbread pastries filled with dates or nuts
Malabi—a milk pudding whose basic ingredients are rice, sugar, rice flour and milk
Matbucha—cooked tomatoes and roasted bell peppers seasoned with garlic and chili pepper
Moroccan cigars—ground beef wrapped in dough
Moussaka—an eggplant- and/or potato-based dish, often including ground meat
Pastel di carne con masa fina
Pescado frito—a traditional Shabbat fish dish (usually cod) for 16th-century Andalusian Jews of Spain and Portugal
Sabich—a sandwich of pita or laffa bread stuffed with fried eggplant, hard-boiled eggs, salat katzutz, parsley, amba and tahini
Sahlab—a hot milk-based winter drink with a pudding-like consistency, possibly containing powder from near-extinct orchids, sometimes garnished with nuts and cinnamon
Shakshuka—eggs poached in a sauce of tomatoes, olive oil, peppers, onion and garlic, commonly spiced with cumin, paprika, cayenne pepper, and nutmeg

Skhug—a hot sauce originating in Yemen
Sofrito—a meat (lamb, beef, chicken) stew sautéed with potatoes, garlic, turmeric, and cardamom
Tabbouleh—vegetarian salad made mostly of finely chopped parsley, with tomatoes, mint, onion, bulgur, and seasoned with olive oil, lemon juice, salt and sweet pepper
Tagine—a slow-cooked savory stew, typically made with sliced meat, poultry or fish together with vegetables or fruit
Tunisian mulukhiyah—a thick beef stew
Yaprah—stuffed grape leaves

See also
Jewish cuisine
Cuisine of the Ashkenazi Jews
Cuisine of the Mizrahi Jews
Spanish cuisine
Portuguese cuisine

References

Further reading
Cooper, John, Eat and Be Satisfied: A Social History of Jewish Food, Jason Aronson Inc., New Jersey, 1993, 
Gitlitz, David M. and Davidson, Dr. Linda Kay, A Drizzle of Honey : The Lives and Recipes of Spain's Secret Jews, St. Martin's Press, New York, 1999, 
 Goldstein, Joyce and Da Costa, Beatriz, Sephardic Flavors: Jewish Cooking of the Mediterranean, Chronicle Books, 2000, 
Marks, Gil, Encyclopedia of Jewish Food, John Wiley & Sons Ltd., Hoboken NJ, 2010, 
Miner, Vivianne Alchech, and Krinn, Linda, From My Grandmother’s Kitchen: A Sephardic Cookbook, Gainesville, FL, Triad Publishing Company, 1984, 
 Roden, Claudia, The Book of Jewish Food: An Odyssey from Samarkand to New York, Knopf, New York, 2003, 
 Sternberg, Robert, The Sephardic Kitchen: The Healthful Food and Rich Culture of the Mediterranean Jews, Harper Collins, 1996, 
 Jawhara Piñer, Hélène, Sephardi: Cooking the History. Recipes of the Jews of Spain and the Diaspora from the 13th Century to Today, Cherry Orchard Books, Boston, 2021, 

Jewish cuisine
 
Mediterranean cuisine
Sephardi Jewish culture